The Ashfield Reservoir is a heritage-listed reservoir located at Holden Street, Ashbury, City of Canterbury-Bankstown, New South Wales, Australia. It was designed and built by the Metropolitan Board of Water Supply and Sewerage. It is also known as Ashfield Reservoir (Elevated) (WS 0003) and WS 0003. The property is owned by Sydney Water (State Government). It was added to the New South Wales State Heritage Register on 15 November 2002.

History

Indigenous history

Early European history
He called his grant Canterbury Vale, as a tribute to Canterbury in England, and the suburb took its name from the farm. The farm extended over the area of modern-day Canterbury and Ashbury suburbs. By 1800, when it was sold to Lieutenant William Cox, the property covered . In 1803, when it covered , it was sold to Robert Campbell the elder (1769-1846), who then bought up most of the land north to Liverpool Road.

The village of Canterbury was formed after 1841 subdivision of this land, then owned by Campbell. Sales of the land in the area west of Canterbury Road and north of the railway, were successful, and several other sales followed in the 1840s and 1850s.

Although the soil in this area was rather poor, there was some farm cultivation, but the main work was wood cutting and carting, and brickmaking. In 1840 the Australian Sugar Company bought  of Campbell's Canterbury estate and a steam engine was installed, but after passing through the hands of several owners, the factory closed in 1856.

The first post office opened in 1858, and the first official public school in 1878, and the district slowly developed. Canterbury Race Course, on the northern bank of the Cooks River has been one of Sydney's major racetracks since 1871. The railway station, on the Bankstown line, opened in 1895.

Reservoir

Ashfield Reservoir (Elevated), (WS 3) built in 1912, is one of a group of four similar elevated reservoirs in the Sydney Water system, the others being Bellevue Hill Reservoir (WS 10), 1910, Drummoyne Reservoir (Elevated) (WS 38), 1910, and Penshurst Reservoir (Elevated) (WS 87), 1910.

Petersham Reservoir supplied western Sydney and Illawarra suburbs. A pumping station at Carlton lifted water to Penshurst to supply the higher areas of Kogarah.

Originally, water from Woollahra Reservoir was fed back to Ashfield Reservoir (1888) to supply the higher areas in Inner West. By 1927 an additional main from Potts Hill supplied Ashfield Reservoir. The reservoir is now supplied by the City Tunnel.

Description 
Ashfield Reservoir (Elevated), (WS 3) is one of a group of four similar elevated reservoirs in the Sydney Water system, the others being Bellevue Hill Reservoir (WS 10), 1910, Drummoyne Reservoir (Elevated) (WS 38), 1910, and Penshurst Reservoir (Elevated) (WS 87), 1910.

Each reservoir is an elevated cylindrical riveted steel tank, resting on a concrete apron and supported on a steel girder frame. The perimeter of the steel stand has a facade of concrete columns and arches, which forms a decorative, rather than a structural feature. The walkway around the rim of the reservoir is attached to the outside and supported on brackets (decking planks removed).

Standard features include: handrail in tubular steel, davit, access ladder, trigonometric station, inlet and outlet valve chambers.

The site includes workshops and offices, as well as access to the Pressure Tunnels. Two skid huts are located in the grounds and are a rare survival, demonstrating former working conditions in MWS&DB.

Modifications and dates 
The reservoir has been roofed to safeguard water quality (1960s-1970s).

Heritage listing 
As at 10 June 2005, Ashfield Reservoir (Elevated) (WS 3) was one of a small group of four similar elevated reservoirs in the Sydney Water system, the others being Bellevue Hill Reservoir (WS 10), 1910, Drummoyne Reservoir (Elevated) (WS 38), 1910, and Penshurst Reservoir (Elevated) (WS 87), 1910. The group of reservoirs demonstrates a high level of engineering expertise and architectural detail, accommodating both structural requirements and aesthetic qualities.

Ashfield Reservoir was listed on the New South Wales State Heritage Register on 15 November 2002 having satisfied the following criteria.

The place is important in demonstrating the course, or pattern, of cultural or natural history in New South Wales.

Ashfield Reservoir (Elevated) (WS 3) is one of a small group of four similar elevated reservoirs, the others being Bellevue Hill Reservoir (WS 10), 1910, Drummoyne Reservoir (Elevated) (WS 38), 1910, and Penshurst Reservoir (Elevated) (WS 87), 1910.

The place is important in demonstrating aesthetic characteristics and/or a high degree of creative or technical achievement in New South Wales.

The group of reservoirs demonstrate a high level of engineering expertise and architectural detail, accommodating both structural requirements and aesthetic qualities, rare in NSW.

The reservoir is a landmark in the surrounding area.

The place has potential to yield information that will contribute to an understanding of the cultural or natural history of New South Wales.

This reservoir demonstrates the high level of technical expertise available to the MWS & DB for reservoir construction at the time.

The place possesses uncommon, rare or endangered aspects of the cultural or natural history of New South Wales.

This reservoir is one of four riveted steel elevated reservoirs on a steel girder stand with concrete surround in the SWC system, rarer still because of the high level of architectural detailing. The "skid huts" are a rare survival.

The place is important in demonstrating the principal characteristics of a class of cultural or natural places/environments in New South Wales.

The riveted steel tank was common technology for surface reservoirs, but was extremely rare when combined with an elevated steel frame with concrete apron.

See also 

List of dams and reservoirs in New South Wales
Sydney Water
Bankstown Reservoir, structure with similar design

References

Bibliography

Attribution

External links

New South Wales State Heritage Register
City of Canterbury-Bankstown
Reservoirs in Sydney
Dams in New South Wales
Articles incorporating text from the New South Wales State Heritage Register
1912 establishments in Australia
Buildings and structures completed in 1912
Buildings and structures in Sydney
Water towers in Australia
Federation style architecture
Romanesque Revival architecture in Australia